Rubidium hydroxide  is the inorganic compound with the formula RbOH. It consists of rubidium cations and an equal number of hydroxide anions. It is a colorless solid that is commercially available as aqueous solutions from a few suppliers. Like other strong bases, rubidium hydroxide is highly corrosive. Rubidium hydroxide is formed when rubidium metal reacts with water.

Uses
Rubidium hydroxide is rarely used in industrial processes because potassium hydroxide and sodium hydroxide can perform nearly all the same functions of rubidium hydroxide.  Metal oxide catalysts are sometimes modified with rubidium hydroxide.

See also
Potassium hydroxide
Sodium hydroxide
Rubidium

References

 
 

Rubidium compounds
Hydroxides